William James Young (September 9, 1881 – December 8, 1957) was an American college sports coach, athletics administrator, professor, physician, and health officer. He served as athletic director at  the College of William & Mary from 1911 to 1913, Grove City College from 1913 to 1915, the University of Maine from 1916 to 1918, and Texas A&M University from 1919 to 1920. Young was the head football coach at William & Mary from 1911 to 1912 and Grove City in 1914, compiling a career college football coaching record of 1–20–3.

Early life, playing career, and education
Young was born on September 9, 1881, in Boston, to James and Sarah Prouty Young. He played football in 1899 and 1900 at Mechanic Arts High School—now known as John D. O'Bryant School of Mathematics & Science–in Boston and ran track in 1900 and 1901 before graduating in 1901. He then attend the International Young Men's Christian Association Training School—now known as Springfield College—in Springfield, Massachusetts. Young played for the Springfield Training School football team for three seasons, from 1904 to 1906 at the fullback, halfback, quarterback, and end positions. He also played on the school's baseball team as a third baseman in the spring of 1907 and graduated from the school that year.

Young moved on the University of Pennsylvania to pursue of medical degree. There he played for three years on the Penn Quakers football as a halfback and three years on the Penn Quakers men's ice hockey at cover point. He graduated from the University of Pennsylvania School of Medicine—now known as the Perelman School of Medicine at the University of Pennsylvania—Doctor of Medicine
degree in 1911.

Coaching, teaching, and medical career
In the fall of 1911, Young was elected physical director, college physician, and coach at the College of William & Mary in Williamsburg, Virginia. In 1913, he was appointed the director of the physical department at Grove City College in Grove City, Pennsylvania and took charge of the school's basketball team that fall. In July 1916, Young was elected professor of physical education and director of athletics at the University of Maine, succeeding Edgar Wingard.

During World War I, Young commanded a United States Army field hospital in France, later retiring as a lieutenant colonel in the United States Army Reserve. In 1919, he was appointed as a professor at the Agricultural and Mechanical College of Texas—now known as Texas A&M University–to teach a physical education course required for all first-year students.

In the 1920s, Young was the health officer for the city of Waterville, Maine and later on staff at the Veterans' Hospital at Togus, Maine. He was the district health officer for Androscoggin, Franklin, and Somerset counties in Maine before his retirement in 1951.

Death
Young died on December 8, 1957, at Central Maine General Hospital in Lewiston, Maine, following a two-day-long illness.

Head coaching record

Football

Basketball

References

1881 births
1957 deaths
20th-century American educators
20th-century American physicians
American football ends
American football fullbacks
American football halfbacks
American football quarterbacks
American men's basketball coaches
Baseball third basemen
Grove City Wolverines athletic directors
Grove City Wolverines football coaches
Grove City Wolverines men's basketball coaches
Maine Black Bears athletic directors
Penn Quakers football players
Penn Quakers men's ice hockey players
Springfield Pride baseball players
Springfield Pride football players
Texas A&M Aggies athletic directors
William & Mary Tribe athletic directors
William & Mary Tribe baseball coaches
William & Mary Tribe men's basketball coaches
William & Mary Tribe football coaches
College track and field coaches in the United States
College of William & Mary faculty
Grove City College faculty
Texas A&M University faculty
University of Maine faculty
United States Army officers
United States Army personnel of World War I
Perelman School of Medicine at the University of Pennsylvania alumni
Coaches of American football from Massachusetts
Players of American football from Boston
Baseball coaches from Massachusetts
Baseball players from Boston
Basketball coaches from Massachusetts
Ice hockey people from Boston
Educators from Massachusetts
Military personnel from Massachusetts
Physicians from Maine